Benjamin Calvin Apuna (born June 26, 1957 in Honolulu) is a former American football player in the National Football League. A linebacker for Arizona State, Apuna was drafted by the St. Louis Cardinals in the 7th round (171st overall) of the 1980 NFL Draft. He played with the New York Giants for just one season in 1980, jersey number 62. Apuna filed a lawsuit for $2 million against Arizona State University, claiming that the university signed him up for an extension course that he did not attend.

References

1957 births
Living people
Players of American football from Honolulu
American football linebackers
Arizona State Sun Devils football players
New York Giants players